The Arpa is a river that flows through Armenia and Azerbaijan's Nakhchivan exclave. It originates in the Vayots Dzor province (marz) of Armenia and is a left tributary of the Aras. It runs through many cities and towns, including Jermuk, Vayk, Yeghegnadzor, Areni, Oğlanqala, Siyaqut and Qışlaqabbas. Spandaryan Reservoir lies on the river.

See also
List of lakes of Armenia
Geography of Armenia

References

Rivers of Armenia
Rivers of Azerbaijan
International rivers of Asia
International rivers of Europe
Rivers of the Republic of Artsakh